Stathis Tachatos (born 12 August 2001) is a Greek professional footballer who plays as a right-back for Super League club Volos.

Career

Early career
Efstathios Tachatos is a full-back who can play on both sides. Characterized by exceptional speed and versatility, he stands out for his dynamism and audacity. Hailing from Akropotamos – he joined PAOK in 2013 – and traveled many miles every day. However in 2016 he moved into the PAOK Academy House. A title-winner with the Under-19 team and part of the squad that has won two undefeated Superleague league titles without losing a single match. He was loaned to Trikala and has now returned for PAOK B.

In summer 2022 he moved to Volos.

References

External links

2001 births
Living people
Footballers from Thessaloniki
Greek footballers
Greek expatriate footballers
Association football defenders
PAOK FC players
Trikala F.C. players
PAOK FC B players
Volos N.F.C. players
Super League Greece 2 players
Super League Greece players